Johann Roppen (born 29 June 1967) is a Norwegian professor of media studies. Since 1 August 2015, he has been the rector of Volda University College.

Education and career
In 2004 he published Medieindustrien, a book which explores the political and economic consequences of this concentration.

Roppen has worked as a journalist at Vikebladet, now Vikebladet Vestposten (1984–87) and served on the national media commissions of both Norway and Denmark (2010, 2011) and the financing committee for the Norwegian Broadcasting Corporation, NRK (2015–16). He has also served on the boards of various businesses and the Volda football team, and been media contact for the deaf for the Norway national women's football team. At Volda University College he has been a faculty member since 1994, was advisor on research and development from 2013 to 2015, then briefly served as communications director before being appointed rector.

Personal life
Roppen is married and has three children.

References

External links 
 Johann Roppen on the website of Volda University College 

1967 births
Mass media people from Bergen
People from Ulstein
Norwegian mass media scholars
Academic staff of Volda University College
Rectors of universities and colleges in Norway
Living people
Volda University College alumni